Klaus Reichert (born 3 June 1947) is a German fencer. He won a gold medal in the team foil event at the 1976 Summer Olympics and a silver in the same event at the 1984 Summer Olympics.

References

External links
 

1947 births
Living people
German male fencers
Olympic fencers of West Germany
Fencers at the 1972 Summer Olympics
Fencers at the 1976 Summer Olympics
Fencers at the 1984 Summer Olympics
Olympic gold medalists for West Germany
Olympic silver medalists for West Germany
Olympic medalists in fencing
Sportspeople from Hanau
Medalists at the 1976 Summer Olympics
Medalists at the 1984 Summer Olympics